Tommy G. Boswell (born October 2, 1953) is a retired American professional basketball player.

A 6'9" (2.06 m) forward/center from the University of South Carolina, Boswell played six seasons (1975–1980;1983–1984) in the National Basketball Association as a member of the Boston Celtics, Denver Nuggets, and Utah Jazz.  He averaged 7.7 points per game in his NBA career and won an NBA Championship with Boston in 1976.

He played for the U.S. men's national basketball team in the 1974 FIBA World Championship, winning the bronze medal.

References

External links

Legabasket.it Profile

1953 births
Living people
African-American basketball players
American expatriate basketball people in Italy
American men's basketball players
Basketball players from Montgomery, Alabama
Boston Celtics draft picks
Boston Celtics players
Denver Nuggets players
Pallacanestro Cantù players
Power forwards (basketball)
South Carolina Gamecocks men's basketball players
South Carolina State Bulldogs basketball players
United States men's national basketball team players
Utah Jazz players
Wisconsin Flyers players
21st-century African-American people
20th-century African-American sportspeople
1974 FIBA World Championship players